Daniel Joshua Giese (born May 19, 1977) is an American professional baseball pitcher and scout. He played in Major League Baseball for the San Francisco Giants, New York Yankees, and Oakland Athletics. He is a scout for the Yankees.

Career

Early career
Giese graduated from Rubidoux High School in Riverside, California, and then graduated from the University of San Diego, where he played college baseball for the Toreros from 1996-1998.

The Boston Red Sox selected Giese in the 34th round of the 1999 Major League Baseball draft. The Red Sox traded to the San Diego Padres with Brad Baker in exchange for Alan Embree on June 23, 2002.

Giese spent the 2002 season and the first month of 2003 in the Padres minor league system before being traded for future considerations to the Philadelphia Phillies.

Philadelphia Phillies
Giese pitched for the Triple-A Scranton/Wilkes-Barre Red Barons and Double-A Reading Phillies from 2004 through 2006. He briefly retired during the 2005 season and finished his degree from the University of San Diego.

San Francisco Giants
On January 8, 2007, Giese signed a minor league contract with the San Francisco Giants. He was a non-roster invitee to the team's spring training. Giese made his MLB debut with the Giants on September 8, 2007, tossing two scoreless innings in a 6-2 loss to the Los Angeles Dodgers. Giese made eight relief appearances with the Giants, recording an ERA of 4.82.

New York Yankees
Giese signed a minor league contract with the New York Yankees in the 2007-2008 offseason. The Yankees purchased Giese's contract from Triple-A on June 3, 2008, and added him to the active roster. He was optioned back to Triple-A one-day later. Giese was called up again on June 6, 2008, due to an injury to Chris Britton.

On June 8, 2008, Giese pitched  innings of hitless relief for his first major league victory. On June 21, Giese made his first career start against the Cincinnati Reds replacing the injured Chien-Ming Wang, tossing  innings while allowing three runs (all unearned) in a 6-0 loss. On August 15, 2008, Giese was placed on the 15-day disabled list with right rotator cuff tendinitis. After recovering, Giese returned to the Yankee bullpen with a scoreless inning of relief against the Tampa Bay Rays on September 2, 2008.

On April 4, 2009, Giese was designated for assignment to make room for infielder Ramiro Peña.

Oakland Athletics
The Oakland Athletics claimed Giese off of waivers on April 8. He would pitch in seven games (one start) for the Athletics, going 0-3 with a 5.32 ERA. On May 18, Giese was placed on the disabled list due to a nerve issue in his right elbow. He had season-ending Tommy John surgery in June, and was expected to miss 12 to 18 months. In October 2009, he was granted free agency. On January 27, 2010, Giese re-signed with the A's on a minor league contract. He began the season with the Triple-A Sacramento River Cats, making eight relief appearances while recording a 1.74 ERA before suffering a torn labrum. He announced his retirement after the season.

Scouting
In January 2014, the Yankees hired Giese as a scout. When Kevin Reese was promoted to director of player development in 2017, the Yankees promoted Giese to succeed Reese as director of professional scouting.

Personal life
Giese and his wife Shannon were married on December 28, 2001. Their daughter Avery was born on January 7, 2006.

References

External links

1977 births
Living people
Augusta GreenJackets players
Baseball players from California
Fresno Grizzlies players
Lowell Spinners players
Major League Baseball pitchers
Mobile BayBears players
New York Yankees players
New York Yankees scouts
Oakland Athletics players
Portland Beavers players
Reading Phillies players
Sacramento River Cats players
San Diego Toreros baseball players
San Francisco Giants players
Sarasota Red Sox players
Scranton/Wilkes-Barre Red Barons players
Scranton/Wilkes-Barre Yankees players
Trenton Thunder players
University of San Diego alumni
Rubidoux High School alumni